Jailbait is slang for a minor who is younger than the age of consent for sexual activity, with the implication that an older person might find him or her sexually attractive.

Jailbait or Jail Bait may also refer to:

Film
 Jail Bait (1937 film), starring Buster Keaton
 Jail Bait (1954 film), directed by Ed Wood
 Jail Bait (1973 film), a German TV film directed by Rainer Werner Fassbinder
 Jailbait, 1994 film starring C. Thomas Howell
 Jail Bait (2000 film), TV film directed by Allan Moyle 
 Jailbait (2004 film), starring Michael Pitt
 Jail Bait (short film), a 2004 film by Ben Sainsbury
 Jailbait, a 2014 film directed by Jared Cohn

Television
 Jailbait (web series), a webseries starring John Lehr
 Jailbait (The Shield), an episode of The Shield

Music
 Jail Bait, an album by Andre Williams or the title song
 "Jail Bait", a 1971 song by Wishbone Ash from Pilgrimage
 "Jailbait", a 1980 song by Motörhead from Ace of Spades
 "Jailbait" (Ted Nugent song), 1981
 "Jailbait", a 1982 song by Aerosmith from Rock in a Hard Place
 "Jailbait", a 1985 song by Grandmaster Flash from They Said It Couldn't Be Done
 "Jailbait", a 2011 song by Avicii

Other
 Jailbait (book), a non-fiction book by Carolyn Cocca
 Jailbait (Reddit), a controversial Reddit community